In mathematics, the uniform limit theorem states that the uniform limit of any sequence of continuous functions is continuous.

Statement
More precisely, let X be a topological space, let Y be a metric space, and let ƒn : X → Y be a sequence of functions converging uniformly to a function ƒ : X → Y.  According to the uniform limit theorem, if each of the functions ƒn is continuous, then the limit ƒ must be continuous as well.

This theorem does not hold if uniform convergence is replaced by pointwise convergence.  For example, let ƒn : [0, 1] → R be the sequence of functions ƒn(x) = xn.  Then each function ƒn is continuous, but the sequence converges pointwise to the discontinuous function ƒ that is zero on [0, 1) but has ƒ(1) = 1.  Another example is shown in the adjacent image.

In terms of function spaces, the uniform limit theorem says that the space C(X, Y) of all continuous functions from a topological space X to a metric space Y is a closed subset of YX under the uniform metric.  In the case where Y is complete, it follows that C(X, Y) is itself a complete metric space.  In particular, if Y is a Banach space, then C(X, Y) is itself a Banach space under the uniform norm.

The uniform limit theorem also holds if continuity is replaced by uniform continuity.  That is, if X and Y are metric spaces and ƒn : X → Y is a sequence of uniformly continuous functions converging uniformly to a function ƒ, then ƒ must be uniformly continuous.

Proof
In order to prove the continuity of f, we have to show that for every ε > 0, there exists a neighbourhood U of any point x of X such that:

Consider an arbitrary ε > 0. Since the sequence of functions (fn) converges uniformly to f by hypothesis, there exists a natural number N such that:

Moreover, since fN is continuous on X by hypothesis, for every x there exists a neighbourhood U such that:

In the final step, we apply the triangle inequality in the following way:

Hence, we have shown that the first inequality in the proof holds, so by definition f is continuous everywhere on X.

Uniform limit theorem in complex analysis
There are also variants of the uniform limit theorem that are used in complex analysis, albeit with modified assumptions. 

Theorem.
Let  be an open and connected subset of the complex numbers.

Theorem.
Let  be an open and connected subset of the complex numbers. Suppose that  is a sequence of univalent functions  that converges uniformly to a function .

Notes

References

 

 E. M. Stein, R. Shakarachi (2003). Complex Analysis (Princeton Lectures in Analysis, No. 2), Princeton University Press, pp.53-54.

 E. C. Titchmarsh (1939). The Theory of Functions, 2002 Reprint, Oxford Science Publications.

Theorems in real analysis
Topology of function spaces